Hans Lackner (1876–1930) was an Austrian stage and film actor.

Selected filmography
 Bogdan Stimoff (1916)
 The Fool and Death (1920)
 Tales of Old Vienna (1923)
 The Little Sin (1923)
 Nameless (1924)
 The Girl Without a Homeland (1927)

References

Bibliography
 Youngkin, Stephen. The Lost One: A Life of Peter Lorre. University Press of Kentucky, 2005.

External links

1876 births
1930 deaths
Austrian male stage actors
Austrian male film actors
Male actors from Vienna
Male actors from the Austro-Hungarian Empire